Without Borders is a 2015 Russian comedy film directed by Karen Oganesyan, Rezo Gigineishvili and Roman Prygunov. The premiere took place on October 22, 2015.

Plot 
The film tells about a group of people who travel to meet love, which has no borders.

Cast 
The Airport
 Aleksandr Pal as Sasha Gorelov, lieutenant of the border service
 Milos Bikovic as Igor Gromov, football player
 Mariya Shalayeva as Masha, an employee of the border service
 Ravshana Kurkova as Kamilla, Igor Gromov's wife

Moscow
 Egor Koreshkov as Ivan
 Roman Mayakin as Aleksandr, Ivan's friend
 Sayora Safari as Saya, the blind girl
 Anastasiya Stezhko as Oksana, Saya's friend

Tbilisi
 Inna Churikova as Nina Polyanskaya, widow
 Oleg Basilashvili as Georgiy, a cemetery worker
 Aleksandr Adabashyan as photographer

Yerevan
 Hrant Tokhatyan as Armen
 Natalia Vdovina as Sveta
 Ivan Yankovsky as Artyom, son of Armen and Sveta
 Anna Chipovskaya as Polina, Artyom's girlfriend
 Elena Khodzhaeva as girl
 Luiza Nersisyan as girl at the airport terminal

References

External links 
 

Russian romantic comedy-drama films
2010s Russian-language films
Russian anthology films
Films shot in Moscow
Films shot in Armenia
Films shot in Georgia (country)
2015 romantic comedy-drama films
2015 comedy films
2015 films
2015 drama films
Films set in airports